The 1971–72 season was the 57th in the history of the Isthmian League, an English football competition.

At the end of the previous season Maidstone United and Wealdstone switched to the Southern Football League, while Athenian League sides Bishop's Stortford, Hayes and Walton & Hersham were newly admitted.

Wycombe Wanderers were champions for the second season in a row, winning their fourth Isthmian League title.

League table

References

Isthmian League seasons
I